Jennifer "Jen" Turner is a singer/songwriter musician and producer.

Career

1991–1997: session and touring guitar player
She first became popular for her work writing and touring with Natalie Merchant
on her multi-platinum album Tigerlily as guitarist and backing vocalist
alongside Peter Yanowitz on drums and Barrie Maguire on bass guitar. She then went on to play acoustic guitar on the Mary J Blige album Share My World.
In 1997, Jen was invited by Miles Copeland III to join Soraya's live band on guitar.

1997–2007: lead singer 
In 1997 she formed the band Furslide alongside bassist Jason Lader, and drummer Adam MacDougall
and released their album Adventure
 on Virgin Records,
recorded in London's Metropolis, Olympic and Abbey Road studios.

Jennifer Turner broke from Virgin to form an independent record label, Caboose Music, a subsidiary of the Virgin group. In 2001, using Inner
as alias she released two records on her own independent record label. Inner's first release was the EP Dog Demos followed by the full-length album Lovetheonlyway the year after.

2007–present: band member, producer and engineer, actor 
Through the middle of the 2000s she kept a lower profile mostly working in bands but not as frontperson.
Starting 2006 she worked with Joseph Arthur and the Lonely Astronauts, played guitar in Santigold’s band and joined Here we go magic playing bass and keyboard. Turner produced and engineered the band's 2010 Album Pigeons and 2011 The January EP.
The same year Jennifer Turner and Henrietta Tiefenthaler, both having a weakness for Krautrock, founded Thrillionaire
– with Joey Waronker, Cedric LeMoyne and Marius de Vries taking part.
In 2012 she formed Exclamation Pony- consisting of Ryan Jarman as lead guitarist & vocalist and Jen Turner on bass & vocals, releasing a single on Julian Casablancas label Cult Records.
Also in 2012, Turner played herself in the movie/biopic Greetings from Tim Buckley.
In 2015 Taylor McLam (drums, vocals) and Chris Traynor (Guitar, Vocals) started working on some music together. Jen Turner (guitar, vocals), Gabriella Da Silva (Vocals), Drew Broadrick (Piano, Vocals) and Sibyl Buck (Bass, Vocals) joined in, forming High Desert Fires.
They released their first EP in 2015.
Also in 2015 she joined the lineup of The Lemonheads for several tours, garnering rave reviews for ‘invigorating the band’.
In 2012 the British music magazine NME did a feature on ‘dream band line-ups’, where Turner was named as a bass player, one of the only contemporary musicians on the list.

Discography

Furslide
Adventure (1998)

 Inner
thedogdemos EP (2001)
lovetheonlyway (2002)

Joseph Arthur and the Lonely Astronauts
Let's Just Be (2007)
Temporary People (2008)

Here we go magic
Pigeons (2009), also engineer, producer
The January EP (2011), also engineer, producer
A Different Ship (2012)

Thrillionaire
Wie geht's, Single (2013)

Exclamation PonyPseudo Individual/Mazes, Single (2013)

High Desert FiresLight Is The Revelation, EP (2015)

Collaborations/producer/engineerNatalie Merchant – Tigerlily (1995), guitar, backing vocalsMary J Blige – Share My World (1997), acoustic guitarPerry Farrell – Song Yet to Be Sung (2001), guitarGutter Twins – Saturnalia (2008), vocalsJoseph Arthur – Could We Survive (2008), vocals, and songwritingJoseph Arthur – Crazy Rain (2008), vocals, and songwritingTeddy Thompson – A Piece of What You Need (2008), backing vocalsJulian Casablancas – Phrazes for the Young (2009), guitarSetting Sun – Fantasurreal (2010), bass, vocalsNoah & The Whale – Last Night On Earth (2011), backing vocalsTEEN – In Limbo (2012), engineer, contribution of vocals, drums and drum loopsSetting Sun – Be Here When You Get There (2014), bassKatie Burden – My Blind Eye EP, 2014, bass, guitar, songwritingSwans – The Glowing Man (2016), engineerAmerican Anymen – Start My Center (2016), producer, keyboard, electric guitarKatie Burden – Strange Moon'' (2016), bass, guitar, wurlitzer, mellotron, songwriting

References

External links

American women singer-songwriters
American women guitarists
Year of birth missing (living people)
Living people
The Lonely Astronauts members
Furslide members
American singer-songwriters
21st-century American women singers
21st-century American singers